Heartbreak (aka Love and War) is a 1931 American Pre-Code war drama film directed by Alfred L. Werker and starring Charles Farrell, Madge Evans and Paul Cavanagh. The film was set primarily in Italy as an exotic locale but was actually filmed in California with the San Gabriel Mountains east of the Los Angeles Basin, standing in for the Italian Alps. The popularity of aviation films on World War I such as Heartbreak was still strong, but by 1934, was perceptibly waning.

Plot
In the years before the United States' involvement in World War I, John Merrick (Charles Farrell) and Jerry Somers (John Arledge), attachés to the American embassy in Vienna, attend an elaborate fundraiser at the aristocratic Walden home where John meets the lovely Countess Vilma Walden (Madge Evans) and romance blooms.

Vilma's twin brother, Count Carl Walden (Hardie Albright), a combat veteran, along with Vilma and Carl's father (Claude King) asks John when Americans will fight against Austria. Kapitan Wolke (Paul Cavanagh), a family friend, emerges as a rival for the affections of Vilma. A heated confrontation takes place between John and Wolke.

When the United States goes to war, John requests a post at the Italian front where Carl is stationed. John returns to the Walden home and breaks the news to Vilma, Vilma then promises to return to the pool by the house, each day until John's reflection appears beside her own.

After duty in France, John is transferred to the Italian front where he faces an enemy squadron, led by Wolke and his "second-best" flier, Carl. In the air over the Italian Alps John spots Wolke's aircraft and shoots it down, landing nearby to try to rescue the pilot. John is astonished to discover that the pilot is actually Carl, who had borrowed Wolke's aircraft for the mission.

John is overcome with grief and announces that he is through with killing. After refusing to join his squadron on a flight against the enemy, John steals an aircraft and flies to the Walden house behind enemy lines. He confesses to Vilma that he killed Carl and begs her forgiveness, but she refuses.

For his desertion, John is court-martialed with Jerry, his defense attorney, unsuccessfully defending him. Despondent and apathetic, he is found guilty and receives a dishonorable discharge and a sentence of hard labor.

Peace finally comes and John goes to visit the Walden estate, now turned into a home for war orphans. As Vilma sits by the pool, she sees John's reflection beside hers, and the reunited couple embrace.

Cast

 Charles Farrell as John Merrick  
 Madge Evans as Countess Vima Walden  
 Paul Cavanagh as Kapitan Wolke  
 Hardie Albright as Count Carl Walden  
 John Arledge as Jerry Sommers  
 Claude King as Count Walden  
 John St. Polis as U.S. Ambassador 
 Albert Conti as Liaison Officer  
 Theodore von Eltz as Military Prosecutor 
 Wilson Benge as Butler (uncredited)

Production
In August 1931, Fox rented the three modified Nieuport 28s for Heartbreak; a Travel Air 4000 was also leased. A Royal Aircraft Factory S.E.5 is also in German markings as Wolke's aircraft. Garland Lincoln and Frank Clarke did the flying in the aerial battles over the San Gabriel Mountains east of the Los Angeles Basin.

Reception
Aviation film historian Stephen Pendo, in Aviation in the Cinema (1985) noted Heartbreak was premiered at the Roxy Theater in New York, and when brief, noteworthy flying sequences took place, "... this portion of the aerial action took place on a large screen."

Aviation film historian James Farmer in Celluloid Wings: The Impact of Movies on Aviation (1984) noted that Heartbreak has "...excellent flying sequences."

References

Notes

Citations

Bibliography

 Farmer, James H. Celluloid Wings: The Impact of Movies on Aviation (1st ed.). Blue Ridge Summit, Pennsylvania: TAB Books 1984. .
 Paris, Michael. From the Wright Brothers to Top Gun: Aviation, Nationalism, and Popular Cinema. Manchester, UK: Manchester University Press, 1995. .
 Pendo, Stephen. Aviation in the Cinema. Lanham, Maryland: Scarecrow Press, 1985. .
 Solomon, Aubrey. The Fox Film Corporation, 1915 - 1935: A History and Filmography. Jefferson, North Carolina: McFarland & Company, 2011. .
 Wynne, H. Hugh. The Motion Picture Stunt Pilots and Hollywood's Classic Aviation Movies. Missoula, Montana: Pictorial Histories Publishing Co., 1987. .

External links
 
 
 

1931 films
1930s war drama films
American aviation films
American war drama films
Films directed by Alfred L. Werker
Fox Film films
American black-and-white films
1931 drama films
1930s English-language films
1930s American films